Chen Yaqiong (born 1956 in Yongchun County) is a Chinese former volleyball player. She was a member of the Chinese national team that won gold at both the 1981 FIVB Women's World Cup and the 1982 FIVB Women's World Championship. She also won a gold medal at the 1982 Asian Games, after which she retired. She later worked for the Hong Kong Liaison Office.

In 2018, the government of her hometown Tangxi Village in Hushan, Fujian built a "women's volleyball spirit" museum by remodeling her former residence, which collected many publications, art works, photos, and personal donations from Chen herself. It is the first women's volleyball museum in China.

She is the Fujianese girl in the 2020 movie Leap.

References

1956 births
Volleyball players from Fujian
People from Yongchun County
Sportspeople from Quanzhou
Living people
Chinese women's volleyball players
Asian Games medalists in volleyball
Volleyball players at the 1982 Asian Games
Medalists at the 1982 Asian Games
Asian Games gold medalists for China